"To come" is a printing and journalism reference, commonly abbreviated to "TK". The abbreviation is used to signify that additional material will be added at a later date.

Originally, TK as an abbreviation may have come into use because very few English words feature this letter combination. Potentially by contrast, using the phrase "to come" could be mistaken as a deliberate part of the text. Plus, TK, and especially the repeated TKTK, is a unique and visually arresting string that is both easily seen in running text and easily searched for, helping editors ensure that placeholders do not end up in published text. 

The Chicago Manual of Style online Q&A on manuscript preparation describes this shorthand as "imprecise", however, stating,

It's best to be more straightforward and specific. For example, use bullets or boldface zeros (••• or 000) to stand in for page numbers that cannot be determined until a manuscript is paginated as a book (but see paragraph 2.37 in CMOS). For items like missing figures, describe exactly what's missing. In electronic environments, you have recourse to comment features, like the <!--comment--> syntax of SGML, which allows for descriptive instructions that will not interfere with the final version of a document.

See also
 
 Lorem ipsum

References

Printing
Placeholder names